Clube Desportivo 1º de Agosto is a multisports club from Luanda, Angola. The club, founded 1 August 1977, is attached to the Angolan armed forces, which is its main sponsor. Its main team competes in men's football, and its professional basketball team is also noteworthy within the club.  The club's colors are red and black. The club won its first title in football, the Angolan League, in 1979. and in basketball in 1980. Handball and Volleyball have also won many titles to the club.

The Primeiro de Agosto Sports Club has its football team competing at the local level, in the events organized by the Angolan Football Federation, namely the Angolan National Football Championship a.k.a. Girabola, the Angola Cup and the Angola Super Cup as well as at continental level, at the annual competitions organized by the African Football Confederation (CAF), including the CAF Champions League and the CAF Confederation Cup.

Achievements
Angolan League: 13 
1979, 1980, 1981, 1991, 1992, 1996, 1998, 1999, 2006, 2016, 2017, 2018, 2018–19
Angola Cup: 6 
1984, 1990, 1991, 2006, 2009, 2019
Runner-up: (6) 1992, 1997, 1998, 2004, 2011, 2017
Angolan SuperCup: 9 
1991, 1992, 1997, 1998, 1999, 2000, 2010, 2017, 2019
Runner-up: (2) 1993, 2007

Recent seasons
C.D. Primeiro de Agosto's season-by-season performance since 2011:

Stadium
Primeiro de Agosto is in the process of building its own football stadium. Named after Gen. França Ndalu, the 20,000-seat stadium whose works began in 2012 and are scheduled to be completed in 2019, is part of a sports complex - Cidade Desportiva 1º de Agosto - that includes a youth academy with boarding facilities and two football courts for training purposes, a secondary school, a university, a tennis court, office buildings, an olympic swimming pool and a 2,500-seat indoor sports arena. The complex and the stadium are located at the Cassequel neighborhood in Luanda.

Starting from the 2020–21 season, the club announced that they will be playing their home games at the França Ndalu.

League and cup positions

Performance in CAF competitions

CAF Champions League: 12 appearances
2019 – Preliminary Round
2018 – Semi-finals
2017 – Preliminary Round
2014 – First Round of 32
2013 – First Round of 32
2011 – 1/16 Finals
2009 – 1/8 Finals
2008 – 1/16 Finals
2007 – Preliminary Round
2000 – Second Round of 16
1999 – First Round of 32
1997 – 3rd Place (group A)
CAF Confederation Cup: 3 appearances
2011 – Second Round of 16
2010 – Second Round of 16
2009 – Quarter-finals
CAF Cup: 2 appearances
2003 – First Round
1996 – Second Round
CAF Cup Winners' Cup: 3 appearances
1998 – Finalist
1991 – First Round
1985 – First Round

African Cup of Champions Clubs: 5 appearances
1993 – First Round of 32
1992 – Second Round of 16
1982 – First Round of 32
1981 – First Round of 32
1980 – First Round of 32

Players and staff

Players

Squad

Staff

Manager history

* Ivo Traça won the 2017 Super Cup as a caretaker manager

Chairman history

* Served two consecutive terms

Sponsors
 Banco de Fomento Angola (BFA)
 Banco Português do Atlântico (BPA)

See also
 Primeiro de Agosto Basketball
 Primeiro de Agosto Handball
 Primeiro de Agosto Volleyball
 Primeiro de Agosto Hockey
 Girabola
 Gira Angola

Trivia
On 4 April 1981, before a 70.000 capacity crowd in Kaduna, Primeiro de Agosto played against then CAN title holders The Green Eagles. In that match that ended in a scoreless draw, D'Agosto put up such a superb performance that the Nigerian supporters and media mistook the club for the Angolan national team.

References

External links
 Girabola.com profile
 Zerozero.pt profile
 Soccerway profile
 Facebook profile

 
Association football clubs established in 1977
Football clubs in Angola
Football clubs in Luanda
Sports clubs in Angola
1977 establishments in Angola